Strawberry Shortcake: Rockaberry Roll is a direct-to-DVD feature that was released on August 12, 2008 by 20th Century Fox Home Entertainment, and was later shown theatrically by Kidtoon Films in October.

Synopsis
Like with the other DVDs of Strawberry Shortcake, Rockaberry Roll uses a "Compilation" format where Strawberry recalls the featured episodes in her "Remembering Book". The episodes featured on this DVD are "It Takes Talent" and "Playing to Beat The Band".

It Takes Talent
Strawberry and her friends form a band called Strawberry Jam. They participate in a talent show, where they almost bomb out due to lack of teamwork.

Playing to Beat the Band
With Ginger Snap gone to her vacation at the beach, Peppermint Fizz offers to help Strawberry Jam get back together and put on a show as a trumpet player, but doesn't get what she hoped for.

Footnotes and references

External links 
 

2008 films
Strawberry Shortcake films
DIC Entertainment films
20th Century Fox direct-to-video films
20th Century Fox animated films